El Portal (Spanish for "The Gateway") is a census-designated place in Mariposa County, California, United States. The population was 372 at the 2020 census, down from 474 at the 2010 census.

History
The first post office at El Portal opened in 1907. 

Work on a four-story Hotel Del Portal began in the fall of 1907 and was completed in 1908 by a subsidiary corporation of the Yosemite Valley Railroad. The hotel was a four-hour ride from Merced via a railway coach. On October 27, 1917, a fire destroyed the hotel including the Desmond Company's records, which was started by a defective attic flue.

Community

El Portal lies along State Route 140 by the Merced River located on the western boundary of Yosemite National Park. It is partly under the administrative jurisdiction of Yosemite National Park.  Community buildings include a post office, community center, and a small school.  Town businesses include two hotels, a small general store, and a gas station.

El Portal plays host to a number of outdoor activities.

El Portal was the terminus of the Yosemite Valley Railroad at the entrance to the National Park, and in 1978 Hetch Hetchy Railroad no. 6 was brought to El Portal and added to the National Register of Historic Places. El Portal is Spanish for "the gateway" derived from this fact.

The National Park Service and several park partner organizations have offices in El Portal.

Geography

Demographics

The 2010 United States Census reported that El Portal had a population of 474. The racial makeup of El Portal was 434 (91.6%) White, 1 (0.2%) African American, 9 (1.9%) Native American, 5 (1.1%) Asian, 0 (0.0%) Pacific Islander, 5 (1.1%) from other races, and 20 (4.2%) from two or more races. Hispanic or Latino of any race were 28 persons (5.9%).

The Census reported that 474 people (100% of the population) lived in households, 0 (0%) lived in non-institutionalized group quarters, and 0 (0%) were institutionalized.

There were 230 households, out of which 41 (17.8%) had children under the age of 18 living in them, 84 (36.5%) were opposite-sex married couples living together, 14 (6.1%) had a female householder with no husband present, 7 (3.0%) had a male householder with no wife present.  There were 12 (5.2%) unmarried opposite-sex partnerships, and 1 (0.4%) same-sex married couples or partnerships. 93 households (40.4%) were made up of individuals, and 13 (5.7%) had someone living alone who was 65 years of age or older. The average household size was 2.06.  There were 105 families (45.7% of all households); the average family size was 2.65.

The population was spread out, with 73 people (15.4%) under the age of 18, 29 people (6.1%) aged 18 to 24, 181 people (38.2%) aged 25 to 44, 156 people (32.9%) aged 45 to 64, and 35 people (7.4%) who were 65 years of age or older.  The median age was 39.4 years. For every 100 females, there were 95.1 males.  For every 100 females age 18 and over, there were 92.8 males.

The homeowner vacancy rate was 0%; the rental vacancy rate was 4.1%.  185 people (39.0% of the population) lived in owner-occupied housing units and 289 people (61.0%) lived in rental housing units.

References

External links

Census-designated places in Mariposa County, California
Merced River
Yosemite National Park
Populated places in the Sierra Nevada (United States)
Census-designated places in California